The 2011–12 TVL Premier League or 2011–12 Port Vila Premier League is the 18th season of the Port Vila Premier League top division.

The top five of the league qualify for the 2012 VFF National Super League.

Amicale FC were the champions and Teouma Academy relegated to the 2012–13 TVL First Division.

Teams 
 Amicale FC
 Ifira Black Bird
 Seveners United
 Shepherds United
 Spirit 08
 Tafea FC
 Teouma Academy
 Tupuji Imere

Standings

References

External links
 

Port Vila Football League seasons
2011–12 in Vanuatuan football
Port
Port